Angel Kolev (15 April 1926 – 1998) was a Bulgarian sprinter. He competed in the men's 100 metres at the 1952 Summer Olympics.

Competition record

References

1926 births
1998 deaths
Athletes (track and field) at the 1952 Summer Olympics
Bulgarian male sprinters
Olympic athletes of Bulgaria
People from Dobrich
20th-century Bulgarian people